The Cima di Fojorina (also spelled Cima di Fiorina) is a mountain of the Lugano Prealps, located on the border between Switzerland and Italy. It lies on the range separating the Val Colla from Lake Lugano.

References

External links
 Cima di Fojorina on Hikr

Mountains of the Alps
Mountains of Ticino
Mountains of Lombardy
One-thousanders of Switzerland
Mountains of Switzerland